Federico Bergonzi (born 12 January 2001) is an Italian professional footballer who plays as defender for  club Feralpisalò, on loan from Atalanta.

Career 
Bergonzi began his career in the Atalanta Youth Sector. In the under-19 team, he made 17 appearances and two assists.

On 12 September 2020, he moved on loan to Feralpisalò in Serie C. On 16 July 2021, the loan was renewed for the 2021–22 season.

Style of play 
He is a very fast right back.

References 

2001 births
Living people
Italian footballers
Association football defenders
Serie C players
Atalanta B.C. players
FeralpiSalò players